Ainsworth Bay is an ice-filled recession of the coastline,  wide, between Cape Bage and Cape Webb in Antarctica. Discovered by the Australasian Antarctic Expedition (1911–1914) under Douglas Mawson, and named by him for George Ainsworth, a member of the expedition who served as leader and meteorologist with the Australasian Antarctic Expedition party on Macquarie Island during 1911–1913.

Bays of George V Land